Shao–Jiang or Shaojiang Min is a Min Chinese language centered on Western Nanping in Northwest Fujian, specifically in the Nanping counties of Guangze, Shaowu, and Western Shunchang and the Northern Sanming county of Jiangle.

Shao-Jiang developed from Northern Min (Min Bei), and was deeply influenced by Gan Chinese and Hakka Chinese. The classification of Shao-Jiang is disputed. It is frequently classified as a dialect of Northern Min, but sometimes it is excluded from Min and classified as Gan Chinese instead. But it is mutually intelligible with neither other Northern Min nor other Gan. Actually it is a collection of dialects which have limited mutual intelligibility instead of a language. Some Chinese scholars call it Min-Gan dialects, Min-Gan transition dialects or Min-Hakka-Gan transition dialects.

References

Min Shaojiang dialect classification at Glossika

Northern Min
Nanping
Fujian